Ronald Lewis (born July 27, 1984) is an American professional basketball player for SLUC Nancy Basket of France's LNB Pro B and formerly for The Ohio State University Buckeyes and the Bowling Green Falcons.

College career
Lewis finished his collegiate career having scored 1,560 points, collected 497 rebounds, and dished out 248 assists. He is an 80 percent career foul shooter and has NBA three point shooting range. He scored a collegiate career high 30 points against North Carolina in 2006. He is notable for his clutch performance in the NCAA Tournament in Round 2 against Xavier. Lewis was undrafted in the 2007 NBA Draft.

Professional career
Ron played his first season of professional basketball in Belgium for the first division team Spotter Leuven. During the 2007–2008 season he was MVP in the 28th round of the Belgium competition. He was the third-best scorer in the Belgian league's regular season, scoring 17.8 points per game. Lewis played for Ironi Nahariya at the 2008–2009 season, and later signed for ČEZ Basketball Nymburk and Dexia Mons-Hainaut. In August 2011 he signed with Hapoel Holon in Israel.

Lewis signed with SLUC Nancy in August 2019.

References

1984 births
Living people
African-American basketball players
American expatriate basketball people in Belgium
American expatriate basketball people in France
American expatriate basketball people in Israel
American expatriate basketball people in Italy
American expatriate basketball people in the Czech Republic
American expatriate basketball people in Turkey
American men's basketball players
Antalya Büyükşehir Belediyesi players
Auxilium Pallacanestro Torino players
Basketball players from Columbus, Ohio
Belfius Mons-Hainaut players
Bowling Green Falcons men's basketball players
Basketball Nymburk players
Élan Béarnais players
Fos Provence Basket players
Hapoel Holon players
Ironi Nahariya players
Israeli Basketball Premier League players
Leuven Bears players
New Basket Brindisi players
Ohio State Buckeyes men's basketball players
Shooting guards
STB Le Havre players
21st-century African-American sportspeople
20th-century African-American people